The Tintic War was a short series of skirmishes occurring in February 1856 in the Tintic and Cedar Valleys of Utah, occurring after the conclusion of the Walker War. It was named after a subchief of the Ute and involved several clashes between settlers and natives, mostly over the natives' theft of cattle because of drought.

Who 

The Tintic War was between the Native Americans previously residing in the Tintic and Cedar Valleys and the settlers. Mormon settlers faced various battles against the Ute tribe that was already living in the valleys. The leader of the Native Americans was a sub-chief named Tintic.

Why 
Originally the settlers and Indians got along fairly well. The war started out as small skirmishes between the settlers and Indians. Then the first battle occurred at Battle Creek. These occurred because the Indians had been displaced from their land by the settlers. During the winter they did not have the necessary resources to survive, and they started to starve. The Euro Americans invaded the area, and proceeded to establish mining communities. They depleted the land of timber, game, diverted the water, and most of the land's resources in general.

The settlers did, however, establish successful livestock and agriculture endeavors on the land. The Indians were forced to start stealing from the settlers in order to survive. Brigham Young was one of the settlers, and he recounts the early troubles by stating, "They came pretty nigh starving to death last winter; and they now see, if they are driven from these valleys in winter, they must perish".

Outcome 
The war concluded with the federal government intervening. They took the Utes from their land to the Uintah and Ouray Reservation. This occurred in the late 1860s and in the Uinta Basin. However, the issues did not resolve overnight. The government never actually bought the Ute lands. This caused issues that persisted after World War II. Then the Indian Claims Commission requested money for their confiscated lands.

References

Conflicts in 1856
Utah Territory
Wars involving the indigenous peoples of North America
1856 in the United States
Indian wars of the American Old West
1856 in Utah Territory
Wars fought in Utah
Mormonism and Native Americans